The 1986 Australian Professional Championship was a professional non-ranking snooker tournament, which took place between 14 and 22 August 1986 at the WIN 4 Studios in Wollongong, Australia.

Warren King won the tournament defeating John Campbell 10–3 in the final.

Main draw

References

Australian Professional Championship
Australian Professional Championship
Australian Professional Championship
Australian Professional Championship